This list contains people who were born or lived in the U.S. state of Mississippi.

Activists and advocates
 Ruby Bridges (born 1954), first African-American child to attend an all-white school in the South (Tylertown) 
 Will D. Campbell (1924–2013), Baptist minister and activist (Amite County) 
 James Chaney (1943–1964), civil rights activist (Meridian) 
 Vernon Dahmer (1908–1966), civil rights activist (Hattiesburg) 
 Charles Evers (1922–2020), civil rights leader, mayor of Fayette (Decatur) 
 Medgar Evers (1925–1963), civil rights leader (Decatur) 
 Myrlie Evers-Williams (born 1933), civil rights activist, journalist (Vicksburg) 
 C. L. Franklin (1915–1984), Baptist minister, father of Aretha Franklin (Shelby) 
 Lloyd L. Gaines (1911–1939?), challenged segregation at University of Missouri School of Law, disappeared in 1939 (Water Valley) 
 Duncan M. Gray Jr. (1926–2016), Episcopal clergyman, civil rights activist (Canton) 
 Winifred Green (1937–2016), civil rights activist (Jackson)
 Percy Greene (1897–1977), journalist, activist (Jackson) 
 Lawrence Guyot (1939–2012), civil rights activist (Pass Christian) 
 Fannie Lou Hamer (1917–1977), civil rights, voting rights activist (Ruleville) 
 Winson Hudson (1916–2004), civil rights activist (Harmony) 
 Clyde Kennard (1927–1963), civil rights activist (Hattiesburg) 
 Germany Kent (born 1975), journalist, social activist (Greenville)
Edwin King (born 1936), civil rights activist, Tougaloo College chaplain (Jackson)
 Joyce Ann Ladner (born 1943), civil rights activist and educator (Wayne County)
 Angela McGlowan (born 1970), Republican political commentator, author, and consulting firm CEO
 James Meredith (born 1933), first African-American student at the University of Mississippi (Kosciusko) 
 Anne Moody (1940–2015), civil rights activist, author (Centreville) 
 Ida B. Wells-Barnett (1862–1931), civil rights activist, women's rights activist (Holly Springs)

Actors and actresses
 Mary Alice (born 1941), actress (Indianola)
 Dana Andrews (1909–1992), actor (Covington County)
 Fred Armisen (born 1966), actor, comedian, and musician (Hattiesburg)
 Roscoe Ates (1895–1962), actor and musician (Grange)
 Katherine Bailess (born 1980), film and television actress (Vicksburg)
 Laura Bailey (born 1981), voice actress (Biloxi)
 Earl W. Bascom (1906–1995), actor (Columbia)
 Willie Best (1916–1962), television and film actor (Sunflower)
 Jimmy Boyd (1939–2009), singer and actor (McComb)
 Don Briscoe (1940–2004), soap opera actor (Yalobusha County)
 Geneva Carr (born 1971), television and stage actress (Jackson)
 Finn Carter (born 1960), actress (Greenville)
 Wally Cassell (1912–2015), film and television actor
 Lacey Chabert (born 1982), film and television actress (Purvis)
 Alvin Childress (1907–1986), actor (Meridian)
 Gary Collins (1938–2012), film and television actor (Biloxi)
 Wyatt Emory Cooper (1927–1978), Broadway actor (Quitman)
 Cassi Davis (born 1964) (Holly Springs)
 John Dye (1963–2011), film and television actor (Amory)
 Mary Elizabeth Ellis (born 1979), television and film actress (Laurel)
 J. D. Evermore (born 1968), film and television actor (Greenville)
 Ruth Ford (1911–2009), stage and film actress (Brookhaven)
 Morgan Freeman (born 1937), Academy Award-winning actor (Charleston)
 M. C. Gainey (born 1948), film and television actor (Jackson)
 Cynthia Geary (born 1965), actress (Jackson)
 Gavin Gordon (1901–1983), film, television, and radio actor (Chicora)
 Allie Grant (born 1994), actress (Tupelo)
 Gary Grubbs (born 1949) (Amory)
 Lynn Hamilton (born 1930), actress (Yazoo City)
 Beth Henley (born 1952), playwright and actress (Jackson)
 Jim Henson (1936–1990), creator of The Muppets (Greenville)
 Anthony Herrera (1944–2011) (Wiggins)
 Wilbur Higby (1867–1934), silent film actor (Meridian)
 Shauntay Hinton (born 1979), actress (Starkville)
 Eddie Hodges (born 1947), child actor (Hattiesburg)
 Olivia Holt (born 1997), actress (Nesbit)
 Thelma Houston (born 1943), actress (Leland)
 James Earl Jones (born 1931), actor (Arkabutla)
 Robert Earl Jones (1910–2006), actor (Senatobia)
 Germany Kent (born 1975), actress (Greenville)
 Simbi Khali (born 1971) (Jackson)
 Diane Ladd (born 1935), actress (Meridian)
 Daniel Curtis Lee (born 1991) (Clinton)
 Tom Lester (1938–2020) (Jackson)
 Martha Mattox (1879–1933), silent film actor (Natchez)
 Shane McRae (born 1977) (Starkville)
 Gerald McRaney (born 1947), actor (Collins)
 Gil Peterson (born 1936), actor (Winona)
 Parker Posey (born 1968), actress (Laurel)
 Evelyn Preer (1896–1932) (Vicksburg)
 Thalmus Rasulala (1939–1991), actor (Arkabutla)
 Beah Richards (1920–2000), stage, screen and television actress (Vicksburg)
 Eric Roberts (born 1956), actor (Biloxi)
 Toni Seawright (born 1964), actress (Pascagoula)
 Larry Semon (1889–1928), silent film actor, director, producer (West Point)
 Jamie Lynn Spears (born 1991), actress, singer (McComb)
 Taylor Spreitler (born 1993), actress, model (Hattiesburg)
 Stella Stevens (born 1938), actress (Yazoo City)
 Tonea Stewart (born 1947) (Greenwood)
 Trinitee Stokes, actress (born 2006) (Jackson)
 Channing Tatum, actor (born 1980) (Pascagoula)
 Byron Thames (born 1969), actor (Jackson)
 Joe M. Turner (born 1969), actor, magician, professional speaker (Brandon)
 James Michael Tyler (born 1962) (Winona)
 Brenda Venus (born 1957), actress (Biloxi)
 Ray Walston (1914–2001), actor (Laurel)
 Sela Ward (born 1956), actress (Meridian)
 James Wheaton (1924–2002) (Meridian)
 Kit Williamson (born 1985), actor (Jackson)
 Hattie Winston (born 1945), actress (Greenville)

Artists
Jere Allen (born 1944), painter (Oxford)
 James McConnell Anderson (1907–1998), potter and painter (Ocean Springs)
 Peter Anderson (1901–1984), potter (Ocean Springs)
 Walter Inglis Anderson (1903–1965), painter (Ocean Springs)
 Earl W. Bascom (1906–1995), painter, sculptor, "King of the Cowboy Artists" (Columbia)
 Howard Bingham (1939–2016), photographer (Jackson)
 Marshall Bouldin III (1923–2012), portrait painter (Clarksdale)
 Andrew Bucci (1922–2014), painter (Vicksburg)
 Byron Burford (1920–2011), painter (Greenville)
 William Dunlap (born 1944), painter (Webster County)
 Sam Gilliam (born 1933), color field painter (Tupelo)
 Theora Hamblett (1895–1977), painter (Oxford)
 Ted Jackson (born 1956), photojournalist (McComb)
 Chris LeDoux (1948–2005), bronze sculptor (Biloxi)
 Alex M. Loeb (1918–2015), painter (Meridian)
 John McCrady (1911–1968), painter, printmaker (Canton)
 Ed McGowin (born 1938), sculptor, painter (Hattiesburg)
 Joshua Meador (1911–1965), animator, artist (Greenwood)
 Fred Mitchell (1923–2013), abstract expressionist painter (Meridian)
 Ethel Wright Mohamed (1906–1992), folk stitchery artist (Belzoni)
 George E. Ohr (1857–1918), potter (Biloxi)
James Seawright (1936–2022), sculptor (Jackson)
 J. Kim Sessums, bronze sculptor, painter (Brookhaven)
 Floyd Shaman (1935–2005), sculptor (Cleveland)
 Glennray Tutor (born 1950), painter (Oxford)
 Gary Walters (born 1941), painter (Jackson)
 James W. Washington Jr. (1908–2000), painter, sculptor (Gloster)
 Dick Waterman (born 1935), photographer and blues promoter (Oxford)

Athletes and sports-related people

Broadcast media personalities
 Paul Gallo (born 1947), radio host (Shaw)
 Lee Habeeb (born 1961), conservative talk radio producer (Oxford)
 Iris Kelso (1926–2003), newspaper journalist and television commentator in New Orleans (Philadelphia)
 Germany Kent (born 1975), media personality, author (Greenville)
 Angela McGlowan (born 1970), Fox News political commentator (Oxford)
 Randall Pinkston (born 1950), newscaster (Yazoo County)
 Robin Roberts (born 1960), newscaster (Pass Christian)
 Norman Robinson (born 1951), news anchor (Toomsuba)
 Tavis Smiley (born 1964), talk show host (Gulfport)
 Shepard Smith (born 1964), Fox News anchor (Holly Springs)
 Paula White (born 1966), televangelist, author (Tupelo)
 Oprah Winfrey (born 1954), talk show host (Kosciusko)

Comedians
 Rod Brasfield (1910–1958) (Smithville)
 Jerry Clower (1926–1998) (Liberty)
 David L. Cook (born 1968) (Pascagoula)
 Tommy Davidson (born 1963), stand-up comedian, most notable for time on In Living Color (Rolling Fork)
 Karlous Miller (born 1983), stand-up comedian (Oxford)
 Tig Notaro (born 1971), stand-up comedian (Jackson)
 Cardis Cardell Willis (1937–2007), stand-up comedian (Forest)

Educators
 Thea Bowman (1937–1990), Roman Catholic religious sister, teacher, and scholar (Yazoo County)
 James Madison Carpenter (1888–1983), folklorist (Prentiss County)
 Richard Carson (born 1955), professor of economics (Jackson)
 Joseph Crespino (born 1972), political scientist (Macon)
 Jesse Dukeminier (1925–2003), professor of law (West Point)
 William R. Ferris (born 1942), folklorist, chairman of National Endowment for the Humanities (Vicksburg)
 Charles Betts Galloway (1849–1909), Methodist bishop, editor (Kosciusko)
 Edgar Godbold (1879–1952), college president (Lincoln County)
 George W. Grace (1921–2015), linguist (Corinth)
 William Baskerville Hamilton (1908-1972), historian, born in Jackson, taught public school in Holly Springs and Jackson
 Robert Khayat (born 1938), chancellor of the University of Mississippi (Moss Point)
 Rory Lee (born 1949), clergyman, college president (Ridgeland)
 Mamie Locke (born 1954), political scientist, dean at Hampton University (Brandon)
 John A. Lomax (1867–1948), folklorist (Goodman)
 Frances Lucas (born 1957), president of Millsaps College (Jackson)
 Bernie Machen (born 1944), president of University of Florida (Greenwood)
 Walter E. Massey (born 1938), physicist, University of Chicago (Hattiesburg)
 William H. Miller (born 1941), theoretical chemist (Kosciusko)
 William Muse (born 1939), chancellor at East Carolina University
 Rod Paige (born 1933), U.S. secretary of education (Monticello)
 Milburn Price (born 1938), hymnologist, dean of School of Performing Arts, Samford University (Electric Mills)
 Dan Reneau (born 1940), president of Louisiana Tech University (Woodville)
 Argile Smith (born 1955), clergyman and educator (Poplarville)
 Louis Westerfield (1949–1996), law professor, first African-American Dean of the University of Mississippi School of Law (De Kalb)
 Fannie C. Williams (1882–1980), normal school educator (Biloxi)

Entrepreneurs and business leaders
 Jim Barksdale (born 1943), president and CEO of Netscape (Jackson)
 Joseph A. Biedenharn (1866–1952), confectioner, first Coca-Cola bottler (Vicksburg)
 George W. Bryan (born 1946), Sara Lee executive (West Point)
 John H. Bryan (1936–2018), Sara Lee executive (West Point)
 Bill Bynum, credit union founder and philanthropist
 Cynthia Cooper, WorldCom vice president, whistleblower (Clinton)
 Bernard "Bernie" Ebbers (1941–2020), founder and CEO of WorldCom, convicted of fraud and conspiracy (Brookhaven)
 Joshua Green (1869–1975), shipping magnate, banker (Jackson)
 Toxey Haas (born 1960), founder and CEO of Haas Outdoors, Inc. (West Point)
 Robert L. Johnson (born 1946), founder of Black Entertainment Television (Hickory)
 Ken Lewis (born 1947), Bank of America executive (Meridian)
 Matteo Martinolich (1860–1934), master shipbuilder (DeLisle)
 Walter E. Massey (born 1938), corporate executive (Hattiesburg)
 Glenn McCullough (born 1954), chairman and CEO of GLM Associates, LLC (Tupelo)
 Charles Moorman (born 1953), CEO of Norfolk Southern (Hattiesburg)
 Clarence Otis Jr. (born 1956), CEO of Darden Restaurants (Vicksburg)
 Hartley Peavey (born 1941), founder of Peavey Electronics (Meridian)
 Pig Foot Mary (1870–1929), culinary entrepreneur (Mississippi Delta)
 Robert Pittman (born 1953), founder of MTV, executive at AOL (Jackson)
 J. H. Rush (1868–1931), founder of Rush's Infirmary (De Kalb)
 Fred Smith (born 1944), founder of FedEx (Marks)
 James Breckenridge Speed (1844–1912), industrial pioneer
 Antonio Maceo Walker (1909–1994), president, Universal Life Insurance Company (Indianola)
 Zig Ziglar (1926–2012), motivational speaker, author, salesman (Yazoo City)

Filmmakers
 Charles Burnett (born 1944), film director and producer (Vicksburg)
 Jamaa Fanaka (1942–2012), film director (Jackson)
 John Fortenberry, film and television director (Jackson)
 Lawrence Gordon (born 1936), film producer, Die Hard (Yazoo City)
 Jonathan Murray (born 1955), creator of the reality television genre (Gulfport)
 Patrik-Ian Polk (born 1973), film writer and director (Hattiesburg)
 Bryan Spears (born 1977), film and television producer (McComb)
 Tate Taylor (born 1969), film director of The Help and Get On Up (Jackson)
 Larry A. Thompson (born 1944), television and film producer (Clarksdale)

Jurists and lawyers
 Rhesa Barksdale (born 1944), federal judge (Jackson) 
 Neal Brooks Biggers Jr. (born 1935), U.S. district judge (Corinth) 
 William Joel Blass (1917–2012), attorney (Wiggins/Gulfport) 
 Debra M. Brown (born 1963), U.S. district judge (Yazoo City)
 Gerald Chatham (1906–1956), lawyer, lead prosecutor in the Emmett Till case (Hernando)
 Bobby DeLaughter (born 1954), prosecutor, judge (Jackson) 
 Jess H. Dickinson (born 1947), associate justice, Supreme Court of Mississippi (Charleston) 
 Boyce Holleman (1924–2003), attorney (Wiggins/Gulfport) 
 Perry Wilbon Howard (1877–1961), assistant U.S. attorney general, Republican leader (Ebenezer) 
 Lucy Somerville Howorth (1895–1997), attorney, judge, state legislator (Greenville)
 E. Grady Jolly (born 1937), judge of the U.S. Fifth Circuit Court of Appeals (Louisville) 
 W. Allen Pepper Jr. (1941–2012), U.S. district judge (Greenwood)
 Charles W. Pickering (born 1937), U.S. district judge (Jones County) 
 Thomas Rodney (1744–1811), U.S. territorial judge (Natchez) 
 Richard "Dickie" Scruggs (born 1946), attorney (Pascagoula)
 Constance Slaughter-Harvey (born 1946), judge and attorney (Forest)
 Michael B. Thornton (born 1954), judge, U.S. Tax Court (Hattiesburg) 
 Michael Wallace (born 1951), lawyer (Biloxi) 
 James R. Williams (1936–2020), lawyer, U.S. attorney (Columbus)

Military figures
 William Wirt Adams (1819–1888), brigadier general, CSA (Jackson)
 Van T. Barfoot (1919–2012), World War II colonel and Medal of Honor recipient (Edinburg)
 William Barksdale (1821–1863), brigadier general, CSA, died at Gettysburg (Jackson)
 William Billingsley (1887–1913), ensign, first Navy aviator killed in an airplane crash (Winona)
 Alvin C. Cockrell (1918–1942), second lieutenant, USMC, killed in World War II (Hazelhurst)
 Fox Conner (1874–1951), major general, U.S. Army, mentor to Dwight Eisenhower (Slate Springs)
 Nathan Bedford Forrest (1821–1877), general, CSA (Hernando)
 Jeffery Hammond (born 1978), major general, U.S. Army (Hattiesburg)
 Randolph M. Holder (1918–1942), USN lieutenant (junior grade) (Jackson)
 Felix Huston (1800–1857), general, Texas army (Natchez)
 Samuel Reeves Keesler (1896–1918), Army aviator (Greenwood)
 Newt Knight (1837–1922), Unionist leader (Jones County)
 Roy Joseph Marchand (1920–1942), World War II fireman first class (Crandall)
 Henry Pinckney McCain (1861–1941), adjutant general, US Army (Carroll County)
 John S. McCain Sr. (1884–1945), USN admiral (Teoc)
 Donald H. Peterson (1933–2018), USAF colonel and NASA astronaut (Winona)
 Charles Read (1840–1890), naval officer (Meridian)
 Viola B. Sanders (1921–2013), USN captain, director of women, U.S. Navy (Sidon)
 Daniel Isom Sultan (1885–1947), inspector general, U.S. Army (Oxford)
 James Monroe Trotter (1842–1892), first man of color to achieve rank of 2nd Lieutenant, U.S. Army, music historian (Gulfport)
 Richard H. Truly (born 1937), USN vice-admiral, astronaut, NASA administrator (Fayette)
 Louis H. Wilson Jr. (1920–2005), Commandant of the Marine Corps and Medal of Honor recipient (Brandon)

Models/pageant winners
 Jennifer Adcock (born 1980), Miss Mississippi 2002 and Miss Mississippi USA 2005 (Hattiesburg)
 Kristi Addis (born 1971), Miss Teen USA 1987 (Holcomb)
 Susan Akin (born 1965), Miss Mississippi 1985 and Miss America 1986 (Meridian)
Asya Branch (born 1998), Miss Mississippi 2018, Miss Mississippi USA 2019, and Miss USA 2020 (Booneville)
 Jenna Edwards (born 1981), former Miss Florida and Miss Florida USA (Brandon)
 Ruth Ford (1911–2009), model (Hazlehurst)
 Taryn Foshee (born 1985), Miss Mississippi 2006 (Clinton)
 Tess Holliday (born 1985), first plus-size model (Laurel)
 Lauren Jones (born 1982), model, Barker's Beauty on The Price is Right, shoe line namesake (Jackson)
 June Juanico (born 1938), beauty queen known for dating Elvis Presley in 1955 and 1956 (Biloxi)
 Nan Kelley (born c. 1965), Miss Mississippi 1985 and GAC's Top 20 Country Countdown hostess (Hattiesburg)
 Kendra King, Miss Mississippi USA 2006 (Monticello)
 Christine Kozlowski (born 1988), Miss Mississippi 2008 (D'Iberville)
 Leah Laviano (born 1988), Miss Mississippi USA 2008, and 1st runner up in Miss USA 2008 (Ellisville)
 Monica Louwerens (born 1973), Miss Mississippi 1995 (Greenville)
 Lypsinka (born 1955), drag performer and model (Hazlehurst)
 Lynda Lee Mead (born 1939), Miss America 1960 (Natchez)
 Mary Ann Mobley (1939–2014), Miss America 1959 (Brandon)
 Kimberly Morgan (born 1983), Miss Mississippi 2007 (Taylor)
 Jasmine Murray (born 1991), Miss Mississippi 2014, Season 8 finalist on American Idol (Starkville)
 Cheryl Prewitt (born 1957), Miss America 1980 (Ackerman)
 Crystal Renn (born 1986), plus-size model and fashion model (Clinton)
 Hannah Roberts (born 1993), Miss University of Southern Mississippi 2015 (Mount Olive)
 Toni Seawright (born 1964), Miss Mississippi 1987; first African-American winner (Pascagoula)
 Naomi Sims (1948–2009), fashion model and author (Oxford)
 Ellen Stratton (born 1939), model and Playboy Playmate (Marietta)
 Amy Wesson (born 1977), fashion model (Tupelo)
 Cindy Williams (born 1964), journalist and Miss Mississippi USA 1986
 Jalin Wood (born 1981), Miss Mississippi 2004 and Miss Mississippi USA 2007 (Waynesboro)

Musicians

Physicians
 Henry Cloud (born 1956), clinical psychologist (Vicksburg)
 Thomas F. Frist Sr. (1910–1998), cardiologist, founder of Hospital Corporation of America (Meridian)
 Arthur Guyton (1919–2003), physiologist, author of Textbook of Medical Physiology (Oxford)
 James Hardy (1918–2003), surgeon who performed the first successful cadaveric lung transplant (Jackson)
 T. R. M. Howard (1908–1976), surgeon and activist (Mound Bayou)
 Edgar Hull (1904–1984), co-founder of Medical Center of Louisiana at New Orleans and Louisiana State University Health Sciences Center Shreveport (Pascagoula)
 Thomas Naum James (1925–2010), cardiologist (Amory)

Politicians

 Thomas Abernethy (1903–1998), U.S. representative (Eupora) 
 Robert H. Adams (1792–1830), U.S. senator (Natchez) 
 James L. Alcorn (1816–1894), governor, U.S. senator (Friars Point) 
 William Allain (1928–2013), governor (Washington) 
 John Mills Allen (1846–1917), U.S. representative (Tishomingo County) 
 Apuckshunubbee (c. 1740–1824), Choctaw chief
 Haley Barbour (born 1947), governor (Yazoo City) 
 Ethelbert Barksdale (1824–1893), U.S. representative, Confederate congressman (Jackson) 
 William Barksdale (1821–1863), U.S. congressman (Jackson) 
 Ross Barnett (1898–1987), governor (Standing Pine) 
 Cheri Barry (born c. 1955), mayor (Meridian)
 Marion Barry (1936–2014), Washington, D.C. mayor (Itta Bena)
 Theodore G. Bilbo (1877–1947), governor and U.S. senator (Poplarville) 
 Marsha Blackburn (born 1952), U.S. representative from Tennessee (Laurel) 
 Hale Boggs (1914–1972), U.S. representative from Louisiana, House majority leader (Long Beach) 
 Mary Booze (1877–1948), first African-American woman to sit on the Republican National Committee (Mound Bayou)
 David R. Bowen (born 1932), U.S. representative (Houston)
 Walker Brooke (1813–1869), U.S. senator (Vicksburg)
 Blanche Bruce (1841–1898), U.S. senator
 Ezekiel S. Candler Jr. (1862–1944), U.S. representative (Corinth)
 Joseph W. Chalmers (1806–1853), U.S. senator (Holly Springs)
 Travis W. Childers (born 1958), U.S. representative (Booneville)
 John Claiborne (1809–1884), U.S. representative (Natchez)
 Bryant Clark (born 1975), state representative, son of Robert G. Clark Jr. (Jackson)
 Robert G. Clark Jr. (born 1928), state representative, speaker pro tempore (Ebenezer)
 Thad Cochran (1937–2019), U.S. senator (Pontotoc)
 James P. Coleman (1914–1991), governor (Ackerman)
 Jacqueline Y. Collins (born 1949), Illinois state senator (McComb)
 Ross A. Collins (1880–1968), U.S. representative (Collinsville)
 William M. Colmer (1890–1980), U.S. representative (Moss Point)
 Greg Davis (born 1966), mayor (Southaven)
 Jefferson Davis (1808–1889), U.S. senator and president of the Confederate States (Warren County)
 Wayne Dowdy (born 1943), chairman of the Mississippi Democratic Party (Magnolia)
 Brad Dye (1933–2018), lieutenant governor (Charleston)
 James Eastland (1904–1986), U.S. senator (Sunflower)
 Ronnie Edwards (1952–2016), Louisiana state representative (Woodville)
 Mike Espy (born 1953), U.S. secretary of agriculture (Yazoo City)
 Robert C. Farrell (born 1936), Los Angeles city councilman (Natchez)
 Erik R. Fleming (born 1965), state representative (Clinton)
 Mary E. Flowers (born 1951), Illinois state representative (Inverness)
 Tim Ford (1951–2015), speaker of Mississippi House of Representatives (Tupelo)
 Kirk Fordice (1934–2004), governor (Vicksburg)
 Webb Franklin (born 1941), U.S. representative (Greenwood)
 Evelyn Gandy (1920–2007), lieutenant governor (Hattiesburg
 James Z. George (1826–1897), U.S. senator (Carrollton)
 Charles H. Griffin (1926–1989), U.S. representative (Utica)
 Gregg Harper (born 1956), U.S. representative (Jackson)
 Pat Harrison (1881–1941), U.S. representative (Crystal Springs)
 Patrick Henry (1843–1930), U.S. representative (Brandon)
 Thomas C. Hindman (1828–1868), U.S. representative from Arkansas (Ripley)
 Jon Hinson (1942–1995), U.S. representative (Tylertown)
 David Holmes (1769–1832), first Governor of Mississippi
 Jim Hood (born 1962), Attorney General of Mississippi (New Houlka)
 Delbert Hosemann (born 1947), Mississippi secretary of state (Vicksburg)
 Benjamin G. Humphreys (1808–1882), governor (Claiborne County)
 Benjamin G. Humphreys II (1865–1923), U.S. representative (Claiborne County)
 William Y. Humphreys (1890–1933), U.S. representative (Greenville)
 Paul B. Johnson Jr. (1916–1985), governor (Hattiesburg)
 Paul B. Johnson Sr. (1880–1943), judge/governor (Hattiesburg)
 Pete Johnson (born 1948), state auditor, co-chair of Delta Regional Authority (Clarksdale)
 Daryl Jones (born 1955), Florida legislator, attorney (Jackson)
 Penne Percy Korth (born 1942), diplomat (Hattiesburg
 L. Q. C. Lamar (1825–1893), U.S. senator and supreme court justice (Oxford)
 Greenwood LeFlore (1800–1865), Choctaw chief, state senator
 Mamie Locke (born 1954), Virginia state senator (Brandon)
 Trent Lott (born 1941), U.S. senator and Senate Majority Leader (Grenada)
 Chokwe Lumumba (1947–2014), activist, attorney, mayor of Jackson
 John R. Lynch (1847–1939), first African-American speaker of the Mississippi House, U.S. representative (Natchez)
 Ray Mabus (born 1948), governor and Secretary of the Navy (Starkville)
 Lewis McAllister (born 1932), state representative (Meridian)
 Glenn McCullough (born 1954), mayor of Tupelo (Tupelo)
 Chris McDaniel (born 1971), state senator (Laurel)
 Anselm J. McLaurin (1848–1909), governor (Brandon)
 Hernando Money (1839–1912), U.S. senator (Carrollton)
 Frank A. Montgomery (1830–1903), state representative and circuit judge (Adams County)
 Isaiah Montgomery (1847–1924), founder, mayor of (Mound Bayou, Mississippi)
 Sonny Montgomery (1920–2006), U.S. representative (Meridian)
 Mike Moore (born 1952), Mississippi attorney general (Pascagoula)
 Stanford Morse (1926–2002), state senator (Gulfport)
 Henry L. Muldrow (1837–1905), U.S. representative and First Assistant Secretary of the Interior (Lowndes County) 
 Ronnie Musgrove (born 1956), governor (Tocowa)
 David Myers (born 1961), politician, state representative (Magee)
 Spencer Myrick (1918–1991), Louisiana legislator (Simpson County)
 Edmond F. Noel (1856–1927), governor (Lexington)
 Joe Nosef (born 1969), attorney, chairman of Mississippi Republican Party (Clarksdale)
 Alan Nunnelee (1958–2015), state senator (Tupelo)
 Rod Paige (born 1933), U.S. secretary of education (Monticello)
 Rubel Phillips (1925–2011), gubernatorial candidate Corinth
 Chip Pickering (born 1963), U.S. representative (Laurel)
 Stacey Pickering (born 1968), state auditor (Laurel)
 John E. Rankin (1882–1960), U.S. representative (Itawamba County)
 Red Shoes (died 1747), assassinated Choctaw leader
 Clarke Reed (born 1928), state Republican chairman (Greenville)
 Jack Reed (1924–2016), Republican gubernatorial nominee in 1987
 Bill Renick (born 1954), mayor, governor's chief of staff (Ashland)
 Hiram Rhodes Revels (1827–1901), first African-American U.S. senator (Claiborne County)
 Carol Schwartz (born 1944), District of Columbia politician (Greenville)
 Abram M. Scott (1785–1833), governor (Wilkinson County)
 Ronnie Shows (born 1947), U.S. representative (Moselle)
 Jim Singleton (born 1931), New Orleans councilman (Hazlehurst)
 Larkin I. Smith (1944–1989), U.S. representative (Poplarville)
 Larry Speakes (1939–2014), presidential spokesman (Cleveland)
 James J. Spelman (1841–1894), journalist, state representative (Madison County)
 John C. Stennis (1901–1995), U.S. senator (De Kalb)
 Bill Stone (born 1965), state senator (Ashland)
 Tom Stuart (1936–2001), mayor of Meridian 
 William V. Sullivan (1857–1918), U.S. representative and senator (Winona)
 Gene Taylor (born 1953), U.S. representative (Bay St. Louis)
 Bennie Thompson (born 1948), U.S. representative (Bolton)
 Jacob Thompson (1810–1885), U.S. representative, secretary of the interior (Oxford)
 W. H. H. Tison (1822–1882), 39th speaker of the Mississippi House of Representatives (Lee County) 
 Amy Tuck (born 1963), lieutenant governor (Maben)
 James K. Vardaman (1861–1930), governor, U.S. senator (Yalobusha County)
 Joseph Warren (born 1952), politician, state representative (Magee)
 Jamie L. Whitten (1910–1995), U.S. representative (Cascilla)
 Roger Wicker (born 1951), U.S. senator (Pontotoc)
 Thomas Hickman Williams (1801–1851), U.S. senator (Pontotoc County)
 Norris C. Williamson (1874–1949), Louisiana state senator (Benton County)
 William Arthur Winstead (1904–1995), U.S. representative (Philadelphia)
 William Winter (1923–2020), governor (Grenada)
 Seelig Wise (1913–2004), planter, state senator (Clarksdale) 
 Fielding L. Wright (1895–1956), governor (Rolling Fork)

Scientists and inventors
 Earl W. Bascom (1906–1995), inventor of rodeo equipment (Columbia)
 Harry A. Cole, inventor of Pine-Sol (Jackson)
 James A. Ford (1911–1968), archaeologist (Water Valley)
 Fred Haise (born 1933), engineer, astronaut (Biloxi)
 Elizabeth Lee Hazen (1885–1975), microbiologist, developer of nystatin (Rich)
 Martin F. Jue, amateur radio inventor, entrepreneur (Starkville)
 Ben Montgomery (1819–1877), freedman, farmer, inventor (Davis Bend)
 Joseph Newman, inventor of the Newman motor (Lucedale)
 Chester H. Pond (1844–1912), inventor of the electrical self-winding clock
 Henry Sampson (1934–2020), inventor (Jackson)
 Roy A. Tucker (born 1951), astronomer (Jackson)

Supercentenarians
 Moses Hardy (1894–2006), lived 112 years and 335 days (Aberdeen)
 Bettie Wilson (1890–2006), lived 119 years and 153 days

Writers
 William Allegrezza (born 1974), poet (Jackson)
 Ace Atkins (born 1970), novelist (Oxford)
 Howard Bahr (born 1946), novelist (Jackson)
 Frederick Barthelme (born 1943), novelist and professor (Hattiesburg)
 Earl W. Bascom (1906–1995), artist and writer (Columbia)
 Lerone Bennett Jr. (1928–2018), editor of Ebony magazine (Clarksdale)
 Douglas A. Blackmon (born 1964), journalist and historian (Leland)
 Maxwell Bodenheim (1892–1954), poet and novelist (Hermanville)
 Margaret Hunt Brisbane (1858–1925), poet (Vicksburg)
 Larry Brown (1951–2004), novelist (Oxford)
 Jack Butler (born 1944), author (Alligator)
 Mary Cain (1904–1984), journalist (Pike County)
 Hodding Carter II (1907–1972), journalist (Greenville)
 Hodding Carter III (born 1935), journalist (Greenville)
 Craig Claiborne (1920–2000), food writer (Sunflower)
 Carl Corley (1919–2016), author (Florence)
 Hubert Creekmore (1907–1966), poet, author (Water Valley)
 Mart Crowley (1935–2020), playwright (Vicksburg)
 Borden Deal (1922–1985), novelist and short story writer (Pontotoc)
 Ben Domenech (born 1981), conservative writer and blogger (Jackson)
 David Herbert Donald (1920–2009), historian (Goodman)
 Ellen Douglas (Josephine Haxton) (1921–2012), novelist (Greenville)
 Eliza Ann Dupuy (c. 1814 – 1880), first woman of Mississippi to earn her living as a writer
 John T. Edge (born 1962), food writer (Oxford)
 W. Ralph Eubanks (born 1957), author, journalist (Mount Olive)
 Woody Evans (born 1971?), technology journalist and short story writer (Hattiesburg)
 John Faulkner (1901–1963), plain-style writer (Ripley)
 William Faulkner (1897–1962), Nobel laureate (New Albany)
 William Clark Falkner (1825–1889), businessman, author (Ripley)
 Vic Fleming (born 1951), puzzle writer (Jackson)
 Shelby Foote (1916–2005), historian and novelist (Greenville)
 Charles Henri Ford (1913–2002), poet, novelist, editor (Brookhaven)
 Richard Ford (born 1944), Pulitzer Prize-winning novelist and short story writer (Jackson)
 Lynn Franklin (1922–2005), author, police detective
 Tom Franklin (born 1963), author (Oxford)
 Ellen Gilchrist (born 1935), novelist, poet, short story writer (Vicksburg)
 John Grisham (born 1955), legal thrillers novelist (Southaven)
 Barry Hannah (1942–2010), novelist and short story writer (Clinton)
 Charlaine Harris (born 1951), mystery author (Tunica)
 Thomas Harris (born 1940), author, screenwriter (Rich)
 Beth Henley (born 1952), playwright and screenwriter (Jackson)
 M. Carl Holman (1919–1988), author, poet, playwright (Minter City)
 Alan Huffman, author, journalist (Bolton)
 Sarah Gibson Humphreys (1830–1907), author, suffragist (Warren County)
 Greg Iles (born 1960), novelist (Natchez)
 Germany Kent (born 1975), author, journalist (Greenville)
 Greg Keyes (born 1963), science fiction and fantasy writer (Meridian)
 Kiese Laymon (born 1974), novelist, memoirist (Jackson)
 Muna Lee (1895–1965), author and poet (Raymond)
 Clinton LeSueur (born 1969), journalist, congressional candidate (Holly Springs)
 Sam Chu Lin (1939–2006), journalist (Greenville)
 Della Campbell MacLeod (ca. 1884 – ?), author, journalist (Greenwood)
 Anne Moody (1940–2015), author, activist (Centreville)
 Willie Morris (1934–1999), author, editor (Jackson)
 Jess Mowry (born 1960), writer of books and stories for children and young adults (Starkville)
 Thomas Naylor (1936–2012), author and economist (Jackson)
 Lewis Nordan (1939–2012), fiction author (Itta Bena)
 Steven Ozment (1939–2019), historian (McComb)
 Walker Percy (1916–1990), author (Greenville)
 William Alexander Percy (1885–1942), author (Greenville)
 Thomas Hal Phillips (1922–2007), author, film actor (Corinth)
 Robert M. Price (born 1954), theologian, writer (Jackson)
 William Raspberry (1935–2012), public affairs columnist (Okolona)
 Kevin Sessums (born 1956), magazine editor (Forest)
 Donald C. Simmons Jr. (born 1963), author and filmmaker (Eupora)
 Roscoe Simmons (1881–1951), journalist, activist (Greenville?)
 Patrick D. Smith (1927–2014), novelist (Mendenhall)
 Robert Bruce Smith IV (1945–2014), author, local historian (Tupelo)
 Lynne Spears (born 1955), author (Magnolia)
 Elizabeth Spencer (1921–2019), novelist (Carrollton)
 Stuart Stevens, author, political consultant (Jackson)
 William N. Still Jr. (born 1932), maritime historian (Columbus)
 Kathryn Stockett (born 1969), novelist (Jackson)
 Kate Stone (1841–1907), diarist (Mississippi Springs, Hinds County)
 Donna Tartt (born 1963), novelist (Greenwood)
 Clifton Taulbert (born 1945), author and speaker (Glen Allan)
 Mildred Taylor (born 1943), author (Jackson)
 Wright Thompson (born 1976), sports writer (Clarksdale)
 Natasha Trethewey (born 1966), 2007 Pulitzer Prize poet (Gulfport)
 Jamie Langston Turner (born 1949), Christian novelist
 Irving Vendig (1902–1995), television writer (Holly Springs)
 Brenda Venus (born 1947), author (Biloxi)
 Howard Waldrop (born 1946), science fiction author (Houston)
 Rosa Kershaw Walker (1840–1909), writer, journalist, newspaper editor (Mississippi)
 Jesmyn Ward (born 1977), novelist (DeLisle)
 Peggy Webb (born 1942), romance novel author (Mooreville)
 Eudora Welty (1909–2001), novelist, short story writer (Jackson)
 Curtis Wilkie (born 1940), journalist, historian (Greenville)
 Paige Williams (born 1969), journalist, author (Tupelo)
 Tennessee Williams (1911–1983), playwright (Columbus)
 Amos N. Wilson (1941–1995), psychologist, author (Hattiesburg)
 Richard Nathaniel Wright (1908–1960) (Roxie)
 Al Young (1939–2021), poet, novelist, essayist, screenwriter (Ocean Springs)
 Stark Young (1881–1963), playwright, novelist, literary critic, essayist (Como)

Other people
 Arthur Blessitt (born 1940), preacher (Greenville)
 Miriam Chamani (born 1943), Mambo priestess, co-founder of New Orleans Voodoo Spiritual Temple (Jackson)
 James Copeland (1823–1857), outlaw and co-leader of Wages and Copeland Clan (Jackson County)
 Cat Cora (born 1967), first female Iron Chef America in franchise history (Jackson)
 Margaret Ferguson (born 1968), political scientist (Hattiesburg)
 Jeff Fort (born 1947), leader of Black P. Stones Nation (Aberdeen)
 Larry Hoover (born 1950), leader of Gangster Disciple Nation (Jackson)
  Abby Howard, internet cartoonist
 Leslie Hubricht (1908–2005), biologist and malacologist (Meridian)
 Mary Comfort Leonard (1856–1940), founder of Delta Gamma fraternity (Kosciusko)
 Floyd Mayweather Sr. (born 1952), boxer (Amory)
 L. H. Musgrove (1832–1868), outlaw hanged by vigilante committee in Denver, Colorado (Panola County)
 Haller Nutt (1816–1864), planter, builder of Longwood (Jefferson County)
 Richard Ragan (born 1964), White House official, UN diplomat (Cleveland)
 The Scott Sisters, convicted of murder in controversial case that drew national attention
 Lenny Skutnik (born 1953), celebrity rescuer of 1982 disaster victim
 Toby Turner (born 1985), YouTube star, better known as Tobuscus (Osborn)

References